Estuardo Díaz Delgado, (born 20 July 1944) is an architect, who was the Mayor of the city of Chimbote, Peru between January 1, 2003 and December 31, 2006.

References

Living people
1944 births
Mayors of places in Peru
Place of birth missing (living people)